The Prairie Wolf Slough, officially known as Prairie Wolf Forest Preserve, is a forest preserve in Deerfield, Illinois just north of Deerfield High School. The name refers to the Native American name of early Deerfield and Jefferson Park pioneer John Kinzie Clark which was nonimoa, or prairie wolf in English. Since 1994, the slough has been routinely burned to allow for more native plants and animals to inhabit it and to prevent overgrowth. The land was purchased by the government in the 1970s and today is used by the nearby high school and surrounding corporate offices as a place to learn, play, exercise, and enjoy.

External links
 Prairie Wolf Forest Preserve - official site

Protected areas of Lake County, Illinois
Nature reserves in Illinois
Wetlands of Illinois
Landforms of Lake County, Illinois